Emilie Rissman is an American professor in the Biological Sciences department at North Carolina State University. 

Her research focuses on estrogens modulate sex differences in behavior. Her research also looks at the effect of parental exposure to Bisphenol A on offspring behavior in mice.

References

North Carolina State University faculty
Year of birth missing (living people)
Living people